This is a list of events from British radio in 1938.

Events
3 January – The BBC Empire Service, begun in 1932, transmits its first programme in a foreign language: Arabic.
30 September – Lieutenant commander Thomas Woodrooffe commentates for BBC radio on Neville Chamberlain's return from signing the Munich Agreement.

Births
17 February – Jo Kendall, radio comedy actress (died 2022)
27 June – Alan Coren, humourist (died 2007)
3 August – Terry Wogan, Irish-born broadcaster (died 2016)
10 September – "Diddy" David Hamilton, born David Pilditch, broadcaster
28 October – David Dimbleby, broadcaster
1 November – Malcolm Laycock, radio presenter and producer (died 2009)
13 December – Chris Emmett, radio comedy actor

References 

 
Years in British radio
Radio